Cyllodania is a genus of jumping spiders that was first described by Eugène Louis Simon in 1902.  it contains only three species, found in Venezuela, Panama, Brazil, and on Trinidad: C. bicruciata, C. trinidad, and C. zoobotanica.

References

Salticidae
Salticidae genera
Spiders of South America